Chekavar (Also known as Chekon or Chevakar, Cekavar) were a warrior surname in Malabar of Kerala. The Chekavar are a common title of the Hindu Thiyya community. Many Thiyya families today trace their roots to this Chekavar lineage.

Warrior role
Exceptionally talented Thiyyar practitioners of Kalaripayattu were given the title chekavan or chekon, and each local ruler had his own militia of chekons. The chekons were lined up for combats and duels, representing the rulers in disputes. In short, they were warriors who fought and died for the rulers, protecting their life and property. Some of the Chekavar families migrated from Malabar to Southern parts of Kerala at the invitation of kings, to train soldiers and lead war. Chekavar formed the army of the Chera Empire.

Some of these heroes are remembered and worshipped even today through folk songs like Vadakkan Pattukal; for example, the 19th century Kuroolli Chekon who fought against the British is remembered through folk songs while the Sangam age hero Akathooty Chekavar,  Commander-in-chief of the Chera army, was adopted into Theyyam forms and is worshipped as a war deity today.

Etymology
Chekavar is derived from the Sanskrit words Sevakar, Sevakan or Sevaka, which mean soldiers in service or soldiers  in royal service. Hermann Gundert's English-Malayalam Dictionary, defines the term as soldiers and warrior.

Origin
Hero stones found in Kerala depict Chekavar engaged in combat, often on behalf of a lord. On the stones, Chekavar are generally depicted by an image of an armed man along with a Shiva Linga. Hero stones were traditionally erected during the Sangam period to commemorate men who had fallen in battle or cattle raids.

History
The Thiyyas community was a warrior caste  that inhabited present day Malabar and Tulu Nadu. They had their own style of martial arts, although it was influenced by the martial arts of the Chera Empire. Jacob Canter Visscher's Letters from Malabar says: 'They may be justly entitled soldiers, as by virtue of their descent they must always bear arms. In spite of the fact that Thiyyas were also practitioners of payatt and had a unavoidable presence in the militia of the ruler, they were allowed in the military services.' In civil war or rebellion, the Chekavars were bound to take up arms for the sovereign; and some princes employed them as soldiers, if they had not a sufficient force of Nairs. 
Hendrik van Rheede, governor of Dutch Malabar between 1669 and 1676, wrote about Chekavar in Hortus Malabaricus: "[Chekavas] are bound to war and arms. The Chekavars usually serve to teach nayros [nair] in the fencing in kalari school".

According to Indudara Menon, "The songs of the Vatakkan pattu (northern ballads) are about a clan of martial Chekavars who were Thiyyas and masters of the martial arts". According to David Levinson, "The Chekavar families played an important role in the practice of Kalaripayattu in the Malabar District".

According to historian A. Sreedhara Menon:

During the British rule, seeing their chivalric fighting skills which can be attributed to their Chekavar lineages, the British formed a separate regiment called the Thiyyar Regiment in the British Indian Army, with thousands of thiyyar soldiers, and officers raised among them.

Notable people
Aromal Chekavar
Chandu Chekavar

References

Thiyyar warriors
Indian warriors